Iftikhar Malik (born 10 November 1949) was a Pakistani cricketer who played for Water and Power Development Authority. He was born in Lahore.

Malik made two first-class appearance for the team, between 1978 and 1979. In the four innings in which he batted, he scored 40 runs, and, from 100 overs of bowling, took 8 wickets.

He was also a cricket umpire. He stood in one ODI game in 1993.

Malik's brother, Ijaz, played first-class cricket between 1960 and 1979.

See also
 List of One Day International cricket umpires

References

External links
Iftikhar Malik at Cricket Archive

1949 births
Living people
Pakistani cricketers
Pakistani cricket umpires
Water and Power Development Authority cricketers
Pakistani One Day International cricket umpires
Cricketers from Lahore